Clarembald or Clarembaud may refer to:

Clarembald (abbot) (fl. 1155–1173), abbot of St Augustine's, Canterbury
Clarembald of Arras (d. c. 1187), French theologian
 (d. c. 1196), French nobleman
Clarembaud de Broies, archbishop of the see of Tyre (1202–1215)
several lords of Chappes:
 (fl. c. 1040–1090)
 (r. 1111–1134)
 (r. 1134–1140)
 (r. 1140–1172)
 (r. 1172–1205)
 (r. 1205–1246)